Teun (also rendered Te'un) is an Austronesian language originally spoken on Teun Island (Mesa, Yafila and Wotludan villages) and Nila Island (Bumei village) in Maluku, Indonesia. Speakers were relocated to Seram due to volcanic activity on Teun.

References 

Timor–Babar languages